Josh Ferguson (born May 23, 1993) is a former American football running back. He played college football for the Illinois Fighting Illini, and signed with the Indianapolis Colts as an undrafted free agent in 2016.

High school career
Ferguson attended Joliet Catholic Academy, where he rushed for 1,868 yards and 25 touchdowns.

College career
After graduating Joliet Catholic Academy, he moved on to the University of Illinois, where he majored in kinesiology. In his senior season, Ferguson had 129 carries for 708 yards and three touchdowns.

Professional career

Indianapolis Colts
While projected to be taken in the fifth or sixth round, Ferguson was not selected in the 2016 NFL Draft. He signed with the Indianapolis Colts as an undrafted free agent on May 2, 2016.

On September 2, 2017, Ferguson was waived/injured by the Colts and was placed on injured reserve. He was released on September 8, 2017. He was re-signed to the practice squad on October 17, 2017. He was promoted to the active roster on October 20, 2017.

On August 22, 2018, Ferguson was waived/injured by the Colts and placed on injured reserve. He was released on September 18, 2018.

Houston Texans
On October 16, 2018, Ferguson was signed to the Houston Texans practice squad, but was released a week later.

New England Patriots
On November 7, 2018, Ferguson was signed to the New England Patriots practice squad, but was released two days later.

Houston Texans (second stint)
On November 12, 2018, Ferguson was signed to the Houston Texans practice squad. He signed a reserve/future contract with the Texans on January 7, 2019. On August 30, 2019, Ferguson was released.

Washington Redskins / Football Team
On October 16, 2019, Ferguson was signed to the Washington Redskins practice squad. He was promoted to the active roster on December 10, 2019, before being released on August 3, 2020.

NFL career statistics

References

External links
Illinois Fighting Illini bio
Indianapolis Colts bio

1993 births
Living people
American football running backs
Illinois Fighting Illini football players
Indianapolis Colts players
Houston Texans players
New England Patriots players
Players of American football from Illinois
Sportspeople from Naperville, Illinois
Washington Redskins players
Washington Football Team players